The New York County Democratic Committee is the affiliate of the Democratic Party in the state of New York. Its headquarters is in Manhattan, New York. County members are elected every odd year by the registered Democrats in an Electoral District.
 during the primary election. Their role is to elect the chair, secretary and treasurer of the New York Democratic Party.

In New York, county executive committees typically select candidates for local public offices, with the county committees ratifying the selections, including judicial candidates and the Democratic Party's nominee in special elections. County committees are composed of at least two members elected from each election district as well as two members elected from each assembly district within the county (assembly district leaders).

Every two years, Democrats in each assembly district elect two district leaders: one male, one female. In principle, county committee members select the county committee chair, but in New York City the practice is that the district leaders control the choice. The district leaders and chair make up the executive committee of the county committee. There are 13 assembly districts in Brooklyn, so when all seats are filled, the executive committee has 80 members. Each election district is made up of a small number of city blocks. Each election district has 4 seats in the general membership of the county committee, so when all the seats are filled, there are approximately 3000 members. However, a vast number of these are left unfilled, undermining broad participation in county decision-making.

Current elected officials 
The following is a list of elected statewide and federal Democratic officeholders:

Members of Congress 
Democrats hold all 4 of New York County's seats in the U.S. House of Representatives and both U.S. Senate seats.

U.S. Senate 
Democrats have controlled both of New York's seats in the U.S. Senate since 1998:

 Class I: Kirsten Gillibrand (Junior Senator) Junior Senator Gillibrand
 Class III: Chuck Schumer (Senior Senator, Senate Majority Leader, Chairman of Senate Democratic Policy Committee) Senior Senator Schumer

U.S. House of Representatives 
 NY-10: Dan Goldman
 NY-12: Jerry Nadler
 NY-13: Adriano Espaillat

Countywide officials 
Democrats control all of the elected countywide offices.

City Council offices 
All of the county's City Council members.

References

External links 
 The County Committee System
 Manhattan Young Democrats
 Democratic County Committee
 Democratic County Committee Members
 Run for County Committee

Manhattan
New York State Democratic Committee